3 Mukha ng Pag-ibig is a 1989 Filipino romantic anthology film starring Sharon Cuneta in all three segments.

Plot
The film is divided into three stories: "I Love You, Moomoo", "Ang Silid" and "Katumbas ng Kahapon".

I Love You, Moomoo
Liza (Sharon) dies during her honeymoon with her husband Ramon (Tonton), but later on returns to earth to help him straighten out his life.

Ang Silid
Mara (Sharon) is an interior decorator who decides to unravel the mystery of the forbidden room.

Katumbas ng Kahapon
Sandra (Sharon) is torn between Olan (Christopher), her husband who is inconsiderate and irresponsible, and Roman (Mat), her former boyfriend who is offering her a much better life with him abroad.

Cast
I Love You, Moomoo
Sharon Cuneta as Liza
Tonton Gutierrez as Ramon
Leroy Salvador as Temyong
Gina Pareño as Magda
Marita Zobel as Mrs. Celia Ortiz
Romeo Rivera as Atty. Ortiz
Ernie Zarate as University Dean
Remedios Novales as Lady Professor

Ang Silid
Sharon Cuneta as Mara
Rowell Santiago as Louie
Julio Diaz as Abel
Charito Solis as Enciang
Raul Aragon as Lt. Boquirin
Vicky Suba as Kathy
Mon Godiz as Lt. Aberin
Sonny Erang as Enteng
Jeffrey Padilla Ong as Ren-ren

Katumbas ng Kahapon
Sharon Cuneta as Sandra
Christopher de Leon as Olan
Mat Ranillo III as Roman
Rosemarie Gil as Sylvia
Subas Herrero as Vicente
Suzanne Gonzales as Karen
Eddie Arenas as Delfin
Zandro Zamora as Kardo
Polly Cadsawan as Paeng
Bernard Atienza as Bernard
Raymond Hombrebueno as Raymond
Ernie David as Policeman

References

External links

1989 films
Filipino-language films
Philippine drama films
Viva Films films